Olney was a railway station on the former Bedford to Northampton Line and Stratford-upon-Avon and Midland Junction Railway which served the town of Olney in Buckinghamshire, England. It was situated on a busy section of line between Towcester and Ravenstone Wood junction which saw heavy use by freight services running between Wales and north-east England. The station closed for passengers in 1962 and completely in 1964, the various connecting routes to the line having closed one by one from the 1950s onwards.

History

Early years
Opened by the Bedford & Northampton Railway on 10 June 1872 as part of its line from Bedford to Northampton, the station came under the control of the Midland Railway on 16 July 1885. It was situated at the beginning of a  climb, averaging 1 in 80, towards the line's summit near Ravenstone Wood Junction. The station was conveniently located near the centre of Olney. An attractive two-storey stone station building was provided on the Down platform where a footbridge provided access to the Up platform and its stone waiting shelter. A  water tank erected in the early 1890s behind the Up platform was supplied with water from the nearby River Great Ouse. An extensive goods shed, goods office and weighbridge were also provided.

On 2 June 1865, powers were obtained for a  extension of the Wolverton to Newport Pagnell Line to Olney. Construction began and a bridge over the Newport to Wolverton road was built. Although terms were eventually agreed by September 1867, there continued to be serious arguments about rental costs for the use of Wolverton and hostility by the London and North Western spread to the question of the Olney extension. Matters came to a head in July 1873 when financial difficulties forced the Newport Pagnell Company to offer to sell their railway to the London and North Western. This was completed on 29 June 1875 following a special meeting of the Newport Pagnell Company where it was agreed to abandon the Olney extension.

Stratford & Midland Junction Railway
On 18 April 1889, the Midland concluded an agreement with the Stratford-upon-Avon, Towcester and Midland Junction Railway (ST&MJR) for running powers over the  section between Ravenstone Wood Junction and Olney, including the right to use Olney station and its facilities. Incorporated in 1882, the ST&MJR was run together with the East and West Junction Railway (E&WJR) under a joint committee which began functioning with the opening of the Olney line to goods on 13 April 1891 and to passengers on 1 December 1892. The ST&MJR merged with the ER&SJR and the E&WJR to form the Stratford-upon-Avon and Midland Junction Railway with effect from 1 January 1909.

Exchange sidings were laid at Olney to handle the traffic and a small engine shed opened in the early 1890s to house the Midland locomotive which worked the short-lived passenger service to Towcester. Near the shed was a  diameter turntable where the S&MJR's locomotives had to be turned as the running powers did not extend beyond Olney. The shed officially closed in 1928 but engines continued to be serviced here until the mid-1950s.

The first joint service, a goods train, ran on 13 April 1891. Services were worked by the Midland with its own engines but they proved too heavy for the track and so East and West Junction Railway locomotives were used between Olney and Broom after 8 December 1891. Between Olney and Towcester, the line was only open at night, with three services departing Olney between 00.00 and 03.30 on Tuesdays to Saturdays; the first two went as far as Broom and the last terminated at Woodford West Junction. Three services terminated at Olney at around 03.00 on Tuesday and Saturday mornings and just before midnight on the other days; the first came from Towcester, and the other two from Broom. On Sundays there was an early goods train to Broom.

Services ran from a bay platform at Olney and connected with Stratford and Blisworth trains at Towcester. The service was however withdrawn due to low patronage; some trains were running empty and the S&MJR was unable to meet the Midland's charges for working the line.

Decline and closure
Following the grouping of 1923, the S&MJR became part of the London, Midland and Scottish Railway (LMS) which, in 1927, reintroduced passenger services between Olney and Towcester in the form of excursion trains on Towcester race days. Although it used the line to provide a shorter route from the west to London than that offered by the Great Western Railway, the LMS did not increase the traffic carried on the S&MJR; in the 1930s, the through goods services consisted of two booked down services and five up services of which three only ran when required. The fastest services over the S&MJR were banana specials bound for St Pancras (Somers Town) from Avonmouth Docks.

Following nationalisation, an increased range of through goods traffic was pathed through Olney, including steel trains from South Wales using the south curve at Broom which were destined for Scunthorpe via Woodford West Junction. However, the fall in traffic carried led, by 1952, to only the Up line to Turvey remaining in use whilst the Down line was used for stabling wagons and coaches. In 1956, the section through Olney, which was now open all day, saw five South Wales to Woodford workings, services from Stratford to Bedford, to Olney and to Turvey, one Clifford Sidings to Olney, plus return workings to Stratford and an additional as required service to Towcester.

Olney lasted six further years, passenger services on the Bedford to Northampton line being withdrawn on 5 March 1962 followed by the withdrawal of goods facilities two years later on 6 January 1964. In its final years, the station was very quiet except for the morning and evening peaks with commuters travelling to and from work in Bedford.

Present day 
Nothing remains today of Olney station, the trackbed through the site having been obliterated by residential development and a new road named "Midland Road".

References

Sources

External links 
1961 passenger timetable
First-hand experience of Olney station

Disused railway stations in Buckinghamshire
Former Midland Railway stations
Railway stations in Great Britain opened in 1872
Railway stations in Great Britain closed in 1962
Olney, Buckinghamshire
Railway stations in Milton Keynes